The fifth season of The Celebrity Apprentice Australia premiered on the Nine Network on 23 May 2021, following a six-year absence. British business magnate and The Apprentice UK host, Lord Alan Sugar leads the series as CEO, while Lorna Jane Clarkson and Janine Allis became the new boardroom advisors.

On 15 June 2021, Shaynna Blaze was declared the winner of the season with the money going to her charity of choice, Voice of Change.

Production

In July 2020, Nine reportedly commissioned Warner Brothers Australia, current owners of the franchise, to make a new season of The Celebrity Apprentice for 2021, series CEO Mark Bouris will not be returning. In September 2020, Nine confirmed at their yearly upfronts that the series will officially return in 2021 with British business magnate and The Apprentice UK host and CEO, Lord Alan Sugar leading the series, along with the reveal of Michelle Bridges, Michael "Wippa" Wipfli and Olivia Vivian as some of the competing celebrities. On 12 October, Nine announced the full list of celebrities competing in the season. In the same month, Josh Gibson and Scherri-Lee Biggs were also announced as competing celebrities.

Candidates

Weekly results

 The candidate won the competition and was named the Celebrity Apprentice.
 The candidate won as project manager on his/her team.
 The candidate lost as project manager on his/her team.
 The candidate was on the losing team.
 The candidate was brought to the final boardroom.
 The candidate was fired.
 The candidate lost as project manager and was fired.

Tasks

Task 1
Airdate: 23 May 2021

Task 2
Airdate: 24 May 2021

Task 3
Airdate: 25 May 2021

Task 4
Airdate: 30 May 2021

Task 5
Airdate: 31 May 2021

Task 6
Airdate: 1 June 2021

Task 7
Airdate: 6 June 2021

Task 8
Airdate: 7 June 2021

Task 9
Airdate: 8 June 2021

Task 10
Airdate: 13 June 2021

Task 11
Airdate: 14 June 2021

Final Task
Airdate: 15 June 2021

Ratings
 Colour key:
  – Highest rating during the series
  – Lowest rating during the series

References

2021 Australian television seasons
Australia 5
Television shows filmed in Australia